Jeff Kurtenacker (born September 7, 1976) is a music composer for video games, television, radio, and film.  He was lead composer on the 2014 MMO WildStar by Carbine Studios, and co-composer on the major release Pirates of the Burning Sea by Flying Labs Software, released in January 2008, and worked on World of Warcraft and Warcraft 3 as a choral arranger and copyist. He lives in Southern California.

Early life
Kurtenacker was born and raised in Green Bay, WI. In 2001 he moved to Los Angeles to complete the Film Scoring program at UCLA Extension. He also has a degree in Music Composition and Audio/Video Technology from Lawrence University in Appleton, WI.

Work and projects

Video game scores
WildStar by Carbine Studios
Mystery Case Files: Dire Grove (contracted by SomaTone Interactive Audio)
Hidden Expedition: Devil's Triangle (contracted by SomaTone Interactive Audio)
Campfire Legends (contracted by SomaTone Interactive Audio)
Avenue Flo - PlayFirst (contracted by SomaTone Interactive Audio)
Cate West 2: The Velvet Keys (contracted by SomaTone Interactive Audio)
Clockwork Man (contracted by SomaTone Interactive Audio)
Karaoke Revolution: American Idol Encore 2 -Horn/String Arranging; Organ/Keys MIDI programming (contracted by SomaTone Interactive Audio)
Warriors Game - HistoryChannel.com (contracted by SomaTone Interactive Audio)
Ben Stein - It's Trivial iPhone game (contracted by SomaTone Interactive Audio)
IGOR - The Game (contracted by SomaTone Interactive Audio)
Forgotten Riddles 2 (contracted by SomaTone Interactive Audio)
Age of Mythology for Nintendo DS (contracted by SomaTone Interactive Audio)
Assault Heroes 2 (XBLA game) - (cinematics only)     (contracted by SomaTone Interactive Audio)
Universal's The Simpsons Ride website mini games music (contracted by SomaTone Interactive Audio)
Pirates of the Burning Sea
Warcraft III - Vocal Orchestrations and Copywork
World of Warcraft - Copywork; some arranging
Karaoke Revolution: American Idol Encore - Horn/String Arranging; Organ/Keys MIDI programming (contracted by SomaTone Interactive Audio)
Mystery Case Files: Madame Fate  (contracted by SomaTone Interactive Audio)
Cate West: The Vanishing Files   (contracted by SomaTone Interactive Audio)
Sunset Studio Deluxe    (contracted by SomaTone Interactive Audio)
Mystery London    (contracted by SomaTone Interactive Audio)
Hotel Mahjong    (contracted by SomaTone Interactive Audio)
Born Punk

Film/Television scores
The Girl Who Wore Freedom (directed by Christian Taylor)
For the Good of the People (directed by Dana Jones)
The Navigator. A short film by Carlo Treviso
Tonic: The Legend of Wooly Creek

Radio/TV commercials
Rich Brother, Rich Sister (book) radio ad
The Seven Sins: The Tyrant Ascending (book) radio and TV ad
The Romanov Bride (book) radio ad
SeaVegg TV infomercial

References

External links
Official website
Rap Sheet on Moby Games
IMDB Credit Sheet
WildStar Video Game
Carbine Studios

Video game composers
American film score composers
1977 births
Living people
Musicians from Green Bay, Wisconsin
Lawrence University alumni